Morgan County Schools can refer to a U.S. public school system in several states, including:
Morgan County Schools (Alabama)
Morgan County School District in Georgia
Morgan County Schools (Tennessee) in Morgan County, Tennessee
Morgan County Schools (West Virginia)